João Zorro was a late 13th century Galician or Portuguese minstrel at the court of Afonso III of Portugal, or as it is most likely at the court of Denis of Portugal. He is noted for his 10 cantigas de amigo about ancient sailors, written on the eve of the great voyages of discovery. Like most similar cantigas de amigo of his time, the musical notation wasn't recorded.

Zorro is unusual among medieval poets for writing about calm and domesticated seas, rather than about wild and deadly oceans. In his poems, sailors only lament about missing their home countries, lovers etc. His work sheds light on the attitudes towards the sea of the early European explorers.

Notes

13th-century Galician-Portuguese troubadours